St Mary's Church is a Grade I listed parish church in the suburb of Prittlewell in the city of Southend-on-Sea, in the ceremonial county of Essex, England. It is the largest and one of the oldest churches in Essex. The church is open for worship. community events and other functions as well as its church hall on Victoria Avenue in the city and both its low phase school on East Street and upper phase school on Boston Avenue which are part of the Church of England's school educational institution.

Architecture
The church was founded in the seventh century as a chapel by the Saxons and between the Twelfth Century and Seventeenth Century. It was added to and became the largest church in the county of Essex and is also one of the oldests churches in the county. The church is also the largest in both Southend and South East Essex.

Gallery

References

Churches in Southend-on-Sea (town)
Grade I listed churches in Essex